Jean-François Humbert (born 17 October 1952) is a French politician and a member of the Senate of France. He represents the Doubs department and is a member of the Union for a Popular Movement Party.

In the 2004 Franche-Comté regional election, he solicited reelection as President of Franche-Comté but was defeated by Socialist Raymond Forni.

On 21 September 2008 he was narrowly reelected as Senator.

On 17 October 2009 he announced that he would challenge Socialist President Marie-Marguerite Dufay and UMP candidate Alain Joyandet in the 2010 Franche-Comté regional election. Nine days later, he resigned the Presidency of UMP Group in the Regional Council.

References

External links 
Page on the Senate website

1952 births
Living people
French Senators of the Fifth Republic
President of Franche-Comté
Franche-Comté Regional Councillors
Union for a Popular Movement politicians
Tibet freedom activists
Senators of Doubs